The individual show jumping event, part of the equestrian program at the 1996 Summer Olympics, was held from 29 July to 1 August 1996 at the Georgia International Horse Park, in Conyers, Georgia. Like all other equestrian events, the jumping competition was mixed gender, with both male and female athletes competing in the same division. There were 82 competitors from 24 nations. Each nation could have up to 4 riders. The event was won by Ulrich Kirchhoff of Germany, the nation's second consecutive victory in the individual jumping (and third overall, tying Italy for second-most all-time after France's four). It was the fourth consecutive Games at which Germany competed that the nation reached the podium in the event—gold in 1936 and bronze in 1952 (with no Games in 1940 or 1944, Germany disinvited in 1948, and either United Team of Germany or separate West Germany and East Germany teams competing from 1956 to 1988), before gold again in 1992 and 1996. The silver medal went to Wilhelm Melliger of Switzerland and the bronze to Alexandra Ledermann of France, the two of whom came out on top of a seven-way jump-off for second place.

Background

This was the 20th appearance of the event, which had first been held at the 1900 Summer Olympics and has been held at every Summer Olympics at which equestrian sports have been featured (that is, excluding 1896, 1904, and 1908). It is the oldest event on the current programme, the only one that was held in 1900.

Seven of the top 10 riders from the 1992 Games returned: gold medalist Ludger Beerbaum of Germany, fourth-place finisher Hervé Godignon of France, fifth-place finisher (and 1988 seventh-place finisher) Jan Tops of the Netherlands, sixth-place finisher Maria Gretzer of Sweden, seventh-place finisher Ludo Philippaerts of Belgium, ninth-place finisher Rodrigo Pessoa of Brazil, and tenth-place finisher Michael Matz of the United States. The reigning World Champion was Franke Sloothaak of Germany.

Saudi Arabia made its debut in the event. France competed for the 18th time, most of any nation.

Competition format

The competition underwent a smaller format change than in the two previous Games. The three-run qualifying and two-run final continued, though the number of finalists was reduced to 25 (from half the field) and there was no cut during the qualifying round or during the final round (only between qualifying and the final). The qualifying round also returned to the traditional fault scoring, rather than the positive points system used in 1988 and 1992.

All riders competed in the three runs of the qualifying round. The three-run total counted as the qualifying score. The top 25 riders advanced to the final, with a maximum of three riders per nation. The final consisted of two runs. The total of the two runs was used for the final score. A jump-off would be used if necessary to break ties for medal positions; other ties would not be broken.

Schedule

All times are Eastern Daylight Time (UTC-4)

Results

Top 25 riders advanced to the final round, maximum of three riders per nation. Qualification round held 21 to 24 July. All scores were reset to zero after the third qualifying round. Final held 4 August 1996. 7 riders tied for second so an additional jump-off round was held.

The Argentine team was disqualified for animal cruelty during training.

References

External links
Official Report of the 1996 Atlanta Summer Olympics

Equestrian at the 1996 Summer Olympics